Genz, a village in Irandegan Rural District, Irandegan District, Khash County, Sistan and Baluchestan Province, Iran
 Christoph Genz, a German tenor in opera and concert
 Henrik Ruben Genz, a Danish film director
 Gen Z or Generation Z
 Q-Genz, a 4-member girl group formed in 2005 by a Malaysian company called Wayang Tinggi

See also 

 Gens (disambiguation)